Super Cycle is a 1986 video game published by Epyx. It is a clone of Hang-On.

Gameplay
Super Cycle is a game in which arcade racing is featured.

Reception
David M. Wilson and Johnny L. Wilson reviewed the game for Computer Gaming World, and stated that "a pleasing translation of the coin-op motorcycle racing hit."

Reviews
ASM (Aktueller Software Markt) - Sep, 1986
Zzap! - Oct, 1986
Computer Gamer - Sep, 1986
ST Action - Jun, 1988
Crash! - May, 1989
Your Sinclair - Jun, 1989
Commodore User (Oct, 1986)
Happy Computer (Sep, 1986)
ATARImagazin (May, 1987)
Génération 4 (1987)

References

External links
Review in Antic
Article in Tilt (French)
Review in Ahoy!
Review in Arcades (French)
Article in Commodore Magazine
Review in RUN Magazine
Entry in The Guide to Computer Living
Review in Your Computer

1986 video games
Amstrad CPC games
Atari ST games
Commodore 64 games
Epyx games
Motorcycle video games
Racing video games
Video game clones
Video games developed in the United States
ZX Spectrum games